Marlin Maldonado (born March 29, 1985 in Santa Cruz del Quiché) is a Guatemalan badminton player.

Career 
She won bronze at the 2006 Central American and Caribbean Games in the Women's doubles and in the Women's singles. In 2007 she won the Carebaco International. At the 2007 Pan American Badminton Championships she finished fifth in the Women's singles. She also reached rank 3 at the 2009 Peru International Badminton Championships in the Women's doubles and in the Mixed doubles.

References 

http://www.tournamentsoftware.com/profile/overview.aspx?id=6BE0C42B-2840-4C60-9509-034215C3FA19

https://www.tournamentsoftware.com/player/C36A90FE-DFA8-414B-A8B6-F2BCF6B9B8BD/13650/tournaments

https://www.tournamentsoftware.com/player/209B123F-AA87-41A2-BC3E-CB57133E64CC/13650/home

https://www.tournamentsoftware.com/player/209B123F-AA87-41A2-BC3E-CB57133E64CC/13650/tournaments

http://www.deguate.com/artman/publish/otrosdeportes/Badminton_con_medalla_de_plata_4333.shtml

http://bwfbadminton.com/player/13650/marlin-maldonado

http://espndeportes.espn.com/oly/panam07/results?discId=59

http://www.cogant.cog.org.gt/ciclo-ol%C3%ADmpico/ciclo-2005-2008/cartagena-de-indias-2006.aspx

http://biblioteca.galileo.edu/tesario/bitstream/123456789/318/1/TESIS%20FINAL%20Ana%20Lucia%20IMPRESION%202.pdf

1985 births
Living people
Guatemalan female badminton players
Pan American Games competitors for Guatemala
Badminton players at the 2003 Pan American Games
Competitors at the 2002 Central American and Caribbean Games
Competitors at the 2006 Central American and Caribbean Games
Central American and Caribbean Games silver medalists for Guatemala
Central American and Caribbean Games bronze medalists for Guatemala
Central American and Caribbean Games medalists in badminton